Airedale NHS Foundation Trust is an NHS Foundation Trust based in West and North Yorkshire, England; it also serves part of East Lancashire.

About

The Trust employs 2,900 people and has 400 volunteers. Each year the Trust treats 25,000 inpatients, 26,000 non-elective patients and 150,000 outpatients. The Emergency Department treats over 51,000 each year. An average 2,600 babies are born each year at the Foundation Trust. The Trust achieved Foundation Trust status on 1 June 2010.  It was formerly known as Airedale NHS Trust.

The trust broke from the national pay agreement in August 2015 by giving a 1% pay rise to its senior non-clinical staff - those earning above £57,069 - in line with the award for the rest of the staff.

In 2017 the trust established a subsidiary company, AGH Solutions Ltd, to which 325 estates and facilities staff were transferred.   The intention was to achieve VAT benefits, as well as pay bill savings, by recruiting new staff on less expensive non-NHS contracts. VAT benefits arise because NHS trusts can only claim VAT back on a small subset of goods and services they buy. The Value Added Tax Act 1994 provides a mechanism through which NHS trusts can qualify for refunds on contracted out services.

In 2022 the outstanding maintenance bill was £414 million, the third largest in the English NHS.

Hospitals

Airedale NHS Foundation Trust currently operates the following hospitals:

Airedale General Hospital, the Foundation Trust's main hospital in Steeton near Keighley, Airedale.
Castleberg Hospital, a small Community Hospital in between Settle and Giggleswick in Craven, founded 1834
Skipton General Hospital, a small Community Hospital in central Skipton, Craven, founded 1899

Additionally the trust provides some services at Coronation Hospital in Ilkley in Wharfedale. The Trust used to formerly own Coronation Hospital; recent talks have led to the possibility to Coronation Hospital returning to Airedale NHS Foundation Trust, however there have also been talks for Airedale NHS Foundation Trust to build a new £3.3 Million Community Hospital to serve the Ilkley area.

The Trust is viewed as a pioneer in telemedicine in the UK and has used the technology to support very vulnerable patients, particularly those with dementia and in nursing homes.  Technical expertise is provided by  Involve-Visual and Red Embedded. Plans were announced in November 2013 to roll the service out to 50 more nursing and residential homes working with Bradford Teaching Hospitals NHS Foundation Trust.

Performance

It was awarded Disability Confident Employer status in 2022.

See also
 List of NHS trusts

References

External links
Airedale NHS Foundation Trust Official Website

NHS foundation trusts
Health in Yorkshire